Partial general elections were held in Luxembourg on 13 and 20 June 1911, electing 21 out of 52 members of the Chamber of Deputies.

Results

References 

Luxembourg
1911 in Luxembourg
1911
June 1911 events